Tõnis Kalde (born 11 August 1976) is a retired football midfielder from Estonia. He played for several clubs in his native country, including FC Kuressaare, and appeared twice for the Estonian national team.

International career
Kalde earned his first official cap for the Estonia national football team on 19 May 1995, when Estonia played Latvia at the Baltic Cup 1995. He obtained a total number of two caps.

References

1976 births
Living people
Estonian footballers
Estonia international footballers
Association football midfielders
FC Kuressaare players